

The flame (Axylia putris) is a moth of the family Noctuidae. It is found throughout Europe then east across the Palearctic to Armenia, western Siberia and Amur, Korea and Japan. The range extends into northern India.

This species has creamy-buff forewings (sometimes tinged with red) with black streaking along the costa. The hindwings are whitish with a dark line along the margin. The wingspan is 30–36 mm. Unusually for a noctuid, this moth rests with its wings wrapped tightly around its body making it resemble a broken twig. It flies at night in June and July (sometimes a second brood is produced which flies in September) and is attracted to light.

Description

Forewing ochreous, the costal area, including cell, dark brown; dark brown patches at outer margin on both folds, the upper connected with outer line by a dark double streak; inner line strongly angulated; outer represented by a double row of vein-dashes: orbicular and reniform stigmata with dark centres and rings; the former small and round, more rarely flattened: the latter large; hindwing whitish, variably suffused with grey; — the form triseriata Moore, originally described from N. India, but occurring in Japan and Korea as well, is larger and darker.

Biology
The larva is grey or brown with black markings and a hump at the rear end. It feeds on a variety of cereals and other herbaceous plants (see list below). The species overwinters as a pupa.

  The flight season refers to the British Isles. This may vary in other parts of the range.

Recorded food plants

Beta – beet
Galium – bedstraw
Hordeum – barley
Lotus – bird's-foot trefoil
Medicago – alfalfa
Polygonum
Rumex – dock
Secale – rye
Taraxacum – dandelion
Trifolium – clover
Triticum – wheat
Urtica – nettle
Vicia – vetch

Notes

References
 Chinery, Michael Collins Guide to the Insects of Britain and Western Europe 1986 (Reprinted 1991)
 Skinner, Bernard Colour Identification Guide to Moths of the British Isles 1984

External links

The Flame at UKmoths
 The Flame at Markku Savela's Lepidoptera pages (Funet)
Lepiforum.de
Vlindernet.nl 

Axylia
Moths described in 1761
Moths of Asia
Moths of Europe
Moths of Japan
Taxa named by Carl Linnaeus